
This is a timeline of Lebanese history, comprising important legal and territorial changes and political events in Lebanon and its predecessor states.  To read about the background to these events, see History of Lebanon.  See also the list of Presidents of Lebanon and list of Prime Ministers of Lebanon.

 Millennia: 2nd BC–1st BC1st–2nd3rd

Centuries: 14th BC13th BC12th BC11th BC10th BC9th BC8th BC7th BC6th BC5th BC4th BC3rd BC2nd BC1st BCSee alsoFurther reading

14th century BC

12th century BC

9th century BC

8th century BC

7th century BC

6th century BC

4th century BC

3rd century BC

2nd century BC

1st century BC 

 Centuries: 1st2nd3rd4th5th6th7th8th9th10th11th12th13th14th15th16th17th18th19th20th

1st century

5th century

6th century

7th century

8th century

9th century

10th century

12th century

13th century

14th century

16th century

17th century

18th century

19th century

20th century

21st century

See also
 Timeline of Beirut
 League of Nations mandate

References 

 http://www.destinationlebanon.gov.lb, Historical Timeline. Retrieved on 2008-06-13.
 History of Lebanon
 Detailed timeline of Lebanese history

Further reading

External links
 BBC News – Lebanon profile 
 The Avalon Project – United Nations General Assembly Resolution 181

 
Lebanese